American Son may refer to:
 American Son (2008 film), a drama film starring Nick Cannon
 American Son (2019 film), a drama film starring Kerry Washington
 American Son (album), an album by Levon Helm
 American Son, an album by Tim Rose
 American Son, an album by Tom Breiding
 American Son, an autobiography by Oscar De La Hoya
 An American Son: A Memoir, an autobiography by Marco Rubio
 American Sons, a 1994 film by Steven Okazaki
 American Son, a fictional powered armor and alias used by Harry Osborn in Marvel Comics